Sijiqing Area is an area and a town on southern Haidian District, Beijing, China. It borders Wanliu Area, Xiangshan and Qinglongqiao Subdistricts to the north, Shuguang Subdistrict to the east, Tiancun Road Subdistrict to the south, Bajiao, Pingguoyuan and Wulituo Subdistricts to the west. It had a population of 162,700 as of 2020.

The subdistrict, Sijiqing, was named after a greenhouse production cooperative that was built in the area during the 1950s.

History

Administrative Divisions 
Sijiqing Area administered 24 subdivisions, including 12 communities, 10 villages and 2 residential areas:

See also 

 List of township-level divisions of Beijing

References 

Haidian District
Towns in Beijing
Areas of Beijing